Woody Lake is a salt lake in the Goldfields-Esperance region of Western Australia, approximately  north east of Esperance. The lake is between Lake Wheatfield to the east and Windabout Lake to the west.

The reserve was originally gazetted as an "A" class nature reserve in 1970. The reserve incorporates most of Windabout Lake, Woody Lake and Wheatfield Lake. The permanent wetlands formed by these lakes and Lake Warden form the Lake Warden System Ramsar site. The wetlands are connected by a series of channels with surface water from Coramup Creek entering the system at Lake Wheatfield and the outflow moving from east to west through Lake Wheatfield directly into Woody Lake via a well defined channel. Woody Lake then overflows into Windabout
Lake, .
The lakes are saline with Woody Lake having an average salinity of 7.37 parts per thousand. Seasonal and annual rainfall determine the average maximum depths of the lakes which vary from being dry in the summer to over one metre in depth in winter. At least 59 species of waterbird have been recorded in the Lake Warden, Woody Lake and Mullet Lake Nature Reserves.

See also

 List of lakes of Western Australia

References

Woody